The first season of the American competitive reality television series Top Chef VIP premiered on Telemundo on 9 August 2022, and concluded on September 26, 2022. The season is hosted Carmen Villalobos, with Antonio de Livier, Adria Marina Montaño and Juan Manuel Barrientos as judges. The season was won by actor Lambda García, who received US$100,000.

Contestants 
Sixteen celebrities were selected to compete.

Contestant progress 

: The celebrity was unable to compete in the challenge due to personal reasons.
: Héctor and Lambda won the Re-entry Challenge and returned to the competition.
 (WINNER) The chef won the season and was crowned "Top Chef".
 (RUNNER-UP) The chef was a runner-up for the season.
 (WIN) The chef won an individual challenge (Quickfire Challenge, Immunity Challenge, Safety Challenge, or Elimination Challenge). 
 (WIN) The chef was on the winning team in the Team Challenge and directly advanced to the next round.
 (HIGH) The chef was selected as one of the top entries in an individual or team challenge, but did not win.
 (IN) The chef was not selected as one of the top or bottom entries in an individual challenge and was safe.
 (IN) The chef was not selected as a top or bottom entry in a Team Challenge.
 (IMM) The chef didn't have to compete in that round of the competition and was safe from elimination.
 (IMM) The chef had to compete in that round of the competition but was safe from elimination.
 (—) The chef was on the losing team in the Team Challenge and was unable to compete in the Immunity Challenge.
 (LOW) The chef was selected as one of the bottom entries in the Elimination Challenge, but was not eliminated.
 (LOW) The chef was one of the bottom entries in a Team Challenge.
 (OUT) The chef lost the Elimination Challenge.

Episodes

References

External links 
 

2022 American television seasons
Top Chef